Deborah Smith Howe (August 12, 1946 – June 3, 1978) was an American children's writer and actress. She and her husband James Howe wrote two books, Bunnicula: A Rabbit-Tale of Mystery and Teddy Bear's Scrapbook, but she died of cancer at age 31 before they were published in 1979 and 1980, respectively.

Deborah Smith was born in Boston, Massachusetts on August 12, 1946. Her father was Lester Smith, a radio newscaster in New York. In 1968, she graduated from Boston University with a B.F.A. in theater. At college, she met James Howe, another student studying acting. They married on September 28, 1969 and then together, they moved to New York City for their acting careers. She played in off-Broadway shows, working as an actress from 1969 to 1978. 

Howe also worked as a model and tape recording artist, and she and her husband created children's records.

In 1978, Deborah and James Howe wrote Bunnicula and Teddy Bear's Scrapbook while Deborah was staying at St. Vincent's Hospital and Medical Center due to her illness. Her husband stated "writing the books became a form of therapy" for them while they were staying at the hospital, since the books were "humorous and they gave us laughter in writing them." She was diagnosed with ameloblastoma, a tumor-forming bone disease, and died 11 months after her diagnosis on June 3, 1978. A children's library at St. Vincent's was later named after her. She was survived by her parents, her husband James, and her younger brother.

Awards
Howe's work has won the following awards:
 AL Notable Children's Books
 CCBC Choices (Cooperative Children's Book Council)
 Dorothy Canfield Fisher Children's Book Award (VT)
 Emphasis on Reading Book Award (AL)
 Golden Sower Award (NE)
 Iowa Children's Choice Award
 IRA/CBC Children's Choices
 Land of Enchantment Children's Book Award (NM)
 Nene Award (HI)
 Pacific Northwest Young Reader's Choice Award
 Sequoyah Children's Book Award (OK)
 South Carolina Book Award
 Sunshine State Young Readers Award (FL)

References

External links
 James Howe at Baltimore County Public Library (archived 2011-12-29) – "Used with permission of Simon and Schuster Children's Publishing"
 

1946 births
1978 deaths
Deaths from cancer
American children's writers